St. Peter's Church, Shorwell is a parish church in the Church of England located in Shorwell, Isle of Wight.

History

The church is medieval.

The interior of the church features a famous 15th century painting of St. Christopher. There is also a painting of the two wives and 15 children of John Leigh.

The church also features an alabaster monument of John Leigh praying, accompanied by his great grandson Barnabas who died at the age of 9 months while Leigh's body was waiting for burial in 1629. They share a tomb which is inscribed;

Organ

The church acquired its two manual organ from St. Andrew's Church, Chale. It dates from 1890 by Henry Jones. A specification of the organ can be found on the National Pipe Organ Register.

References

Church of England church buildings on the Isle of Wight
Grade I listed churches on the Isle of Wight